Keith A. Wester (February 21, 1940 – November 1, 2002) was an American sound engineer. He was nominated for six Academy Awards in the category Best Sound. He worked on nearly 60 films between 1966 and 2002.

Selected filmography
 Black Rain (1989)
 Waterworld (1995)
 The Rock (1996)
 Air Force One (1997)
 Armageddon (1998)
 The Perfect Storm (2000)

References

External links

1940 births
2002 deaths
American audio engineers
Burials at Forest Lawn Memorial Park (Hollywood Hills)
People from Seattle
Emmy Award winners
People from Studio City, Los Angeles
Engineers from California
20th-century American engineers